Orthogonius flavipes is a species of ground beetle in the subfamily Orthogoniinae. It was described by Deuve in 2004.

References

flavipes
Beetles described in 2004